Syllepte cyanea is a moth in the family Crambidae. It is found in Brazil (Amazonas, Ega).

References

Moths described in 1866
cyanea
Moths of South America